Shiver (released in the Philippines as Haunted Spirit) is a 2003 Hong Kong horror film directed by Billy Chung and starring Francis Ng, Athena Chu, Nick Cheung and Tiffany Lee.

Plot
Regional Crime Unit officer Chan Kwok-ming (Francis Ng) and his wife, Sammi Mok (Athena Chu) were on the way to finalize their proceedings for separation where an armed robbery breaks out in the streets. Kwok-ming steps in to assist in hunting the criminals, but Sammi was hit by a stray bullet and was seriously injured, leading her into a coma. Several months later, Sammi awakes from her coma. Sammi's doctor, Ko Chuen (Nick Cheung) warns her to be especially careful with her body as her blood type is very rare.

Since Kwok-ming is often busy and handling cases at the police station, Sammi is left home along to recover and have been hallucinating often lately. One time, Sammi sees a female celebrity, Kitty Chow (Tiffany Lee), killed in her hallucination. While being skeptical, Sammi walks into the back alley of a bar and discovers the corpse of Kitty. Since then, Sammi's mental became more severe. When Kwok-ming wanted to take a leave at the police station, his supervisor demands him to cancel all his leaves and investigate the case of Kitty Chow's murder. One night, Kwok-ming returns home and sees the walls being covered in words written with blood. The same night, Sammi also goes mad and heads into the road, causing serious traffic congestion. Afterwards, Sammi was taken to hospital to be examined by a psychiatrist.

Meanwhile, Kwok-ming was investigating another case where a lawyer was murdered and discovers that the case is linked to the murder of Kitty Chow. While the crime scene, Kwok-ming shockingly witnesses the lawyer coming back to life and takes him to the hospital. In the hospital, Kwok-ming is informed that the lawyer requires an emergency blood transfusion from a rare blood type, which incidentally, happen to be the same blood type as Sammi. However, in this critical moment, Sammi mysteriously goes missing.

Cast
Francis Ng as Chan Kwok-ming (陳國明)
Athena Chu as Sammi Mok (莫心怡)
Nick Cheung as Dr. Ko Chuen (高川醫生)
Tiffany Lee as Kitty Chow (周潔瑜)
Benz Hui as Kwok-ming's supervisor
Patrick Tang as Kwok-ming's subordinate
Ben Cheung as Kwok-ming's subordinate
Gloria Wong as Bobo Chan
Viann Leung as Tracy
Felix Lok as Coroner Bee (B哥)
Siu Hung as Security guard
Wong Man-shing as Robber
Vincent Chik as Robber
Wong Yui-sang as Robber
Lam Kwok-kit as Policeman
Lui Siu-ming as Policeman
Sin Yan-kau
Benny Lai

Release
Shiver was released in Hong Kong on 4 September 2003. In the Philippines, the film was released as Haunted Spirit on 28 April 2004.

Critical reception
Beyond Hollywood gave the film a mixed review, praising lead actor Francis Ng's performance and concluded the review stating "although it’s not a film of spectacular quality, there’s enough about Shiver to recommend." LoveHKFilm praised the direction of Billy Chung and the performances of Ng, Athena Chu and Nick Cheung, but criticizes how problems were easily and conveniently resolved. So Good Reviews  praises its "effective establishments of character relationships" and Chung's direction of quick cut horror imagery, but criticizes the cinematography as "flat."

References

External links

Shiver at Hong Kong Cinemagic

2003 films
2000s Cantonese-language films
2000s psychological horror films
2000s mystery horror films
2003 horror films
Films set in Hong Kong
Films shot in Hong Kong
Hong Kong ghost films
Hong Kong horror films
Hong Kong psychological horror films
Hong Kong serial killer films
Police detective films
2000s Hong Kong films